Sir Thomas Burdett, 1st Baronet (3 August 1585 – ca. 1647) was an English Sheriff and baronet.

Burdett was born on 3 August 1585, the son of Robert Burdett and Mary Wilson. He married Jane Francis, daughter of William Francis and Elizabeth Francis, in 1602. He matriculated at Balliol College, Oxford on 6 May 1603. He held the office of High Sheriff of Derbyshire from 1610 to 1611. He was created 1st Baronet Burdett, of Bramcote, Warwickshire on 25 February 1619.

Burdett died aged 61 circa 1647. He was buried at Repton, Derbyshire. His will was probated on 22 May 1647. His son Francis (10 September 1608 - 30 December 1696) inherited the baronetcy.

References

thepeerage.com/p18899.htm#i18892

1585 births
1640s deaths
Alumni of Balliol College, Oxford
Baronets in the Baronetage of England
High Sheriffs of Derbyshire